Prodigal Son, or Le Fils prodigue, Op. 46 is a ballet created for Diaghilev's Ballets Russes by George Balanchine to music by Sergei Prokofiev (1928–29).  The libretto, based on the parable in the Gospel of Luke, was by Boris Kochno, who added a good deal of drama and emphasized the theme of sin and redemption ending with the Prodigal Son's return. 

Susan Au writes in Ballet and Modern Dance that the ballet was the last of the Diaghilev era, choreographed the year the great impresario died.  She continues: "Adapted from the biblical story, it opens with the prodigal's rebellious departure from home and his seduction by the beautiful but treacherous siren, whose followers rob him. Wretched and remorseful, he drags himself back to his forgiving father."

History 
Serge Lifar created the role. The premiere took place on Tuesday, 21 May 1929 at the Théâtre Sarah Bernhardt, Paris, with décor by Georges Rouault and lighting by Ronald Bates, in what was to be the Ballets Russes's last Paris season: "Balanchine's choreography upset Prokofiev, who conducted the premiere. The composer had envisioned a production that was 'real'; his concept of the Siren, whom he saw as demure, differed radically from Balanchine's. Prokofiev refused to pay Balanchine royalties for his choreography."

Balanchine's American Ballet danced Prodigal Son at its first public performance in 1934.

The New York City Ballet premiere was on Thursday, 23 February 1950 at City Center of Music and Drama, New York, the title role danced by Jerome Robbins, with lighting by Mark Stanley. Hugh Laing and Francisco Moncion also danced it before it lapsed from the performance rota for a decade. It was restaged in 1960 with Edward Villella in the title role (Villella recounts his work in recreating the role in his autobiography of the same name).

Mikhail Baryshnikov danced it with City Ballet in 1979 and Damian Woetzel danced it at his farewell performance on Wednesday, 18 June 2008.

Prokofiev used the music from the ballet to form the basis of the two versions of his Symphony No. 4 composed in 1929 and 1947, respectively.

Cast

Premiere cast
Felia Doubrovska
Eleanora Marra
Nathalie Branitzka 
Serge Lifar
Michael Fedorov (Sophie Fedorova's brother)
Léon Woizikowsky
Anton Dolin

New York City Ballet revivals 
2008 Winter
2008 Spring

Teresa Reichlen
Pauline Golbin
Dena Abergel
Daniel Ulbricht
Ask la Cour
Antonio Carmena
Kyle Froman 

Maria Kowroski
Pauline Golbin
Dena Abergel 
Damian Woetzel (Damian Woetzel's farewell)
Ask la Cour
Sean Suozzi
Adam Hendrickson

Notes

References
 Playbill, New York City Ballet, Thursday, June 19, 2008
 Repertory Week, New York City Ballet, Spring Season, 2008 repertory, week 8

Articles
Sunday New York Times by John Martin, November 4, 1934

Obituaries
New York Times of Felia Doubrovska by Jack Anderson, September 21, 1981

Reviews
  
New York Times by John Martin, February 24, 1950 
New York Times by Anna Kisselgoff, January 13, 1979
 
 Ballet Magazine, by Eric Taub, February–March 2004
New York Times by Alastair Macaulay, June 10, 2008

External links
 
 Prodigal Son on the website of the Balanchine Trust

 

Ballets by George Balanchine
Ballets by Sergei Prokofiev
Ballets by Boris Kochno
Ballets designed by Georges Rouault
Ballets designed by Ronald Bates
1929 ballet premieres
Ballets Russes productions
1929 compositions
New York City Ballet repertory